Protected areas cover around 5% of the territory of Serbia. The Law on the Protection of the Nature defines these categories of protected areas:
 Strict nature reserve — Area of unmodified natural features with representative ecosystems set aside for the preservation of its biodiversity and for scientific research and monitoring.
 Special nature reserve — Area of unmodified or slightly modified natural features of great importance due to uniqueness and rarity which includes the habitats of endangered species set aside for the preservation of its unique features, education, limited tourism and for scientific research and monitoring.
 National park — Area with large number of diverse ecosystems of national value, with outstanding natural features and/or cultural heritage set aside for the preservation of its natural resources and for educational, scientific and tourist use.
 Natural monument — Small unmodified or slightly modified natural feature, object or phenomenon, easily detectable and unique, with unique natural attributes.
 Protected habitat — Area which includes habitats of one or more wildlife species.
 Landscape of outstanding features — Area of remarkable appearance with important natural and cultural value.
 Nature park — Area of well-preserved natural values with preserved natural ecosystems and picturesque landscape set aside for the preservation of biodiversity and for educational, tourist, recreational and scientific use.

National parks

There are 5 national parks in Serbia (IUCN Category II) as of 2007, and one more which is proposed and is in the procedure of receiving the status of the National Park: One of those National parks (Šar Mountain) is located on the territory of Kosovo. Although Kosovo declared independence in 2008, Serbian government does not recognize this, so Šar Mountain is still listed as a Serbian National park by Serbian authorities.

Nature reserves
There are 22 nature reserves (IUCN category Ia) in Serbia and 6 more which are in the procedure of receiving the status of a Nature reserve. They are grouped into two groups: Strict Nature Reserves and Special Nature Reserves:

Nature Parks and Landscapes of Outstanding Features
There are 23 Nature parks and Landscapes of Outstanding Features (IUCN Category Ib) and 8 more which are in the procedure of receiving the status of a Nature park or a Landscape of outstanding features:

Natural monuments
There are currently 64 natural monuments of geological heritage and 225 monuments of botanical heritage (mostly rare trees) in Serbia. Some of the best known monuments of geological heritage are: Resavska cave, Đavolja Varoš, Marble cave and Rugova Canyon.

See also
Cultural Heritage of Serbia
List of World Heritage Sites in Serbia
List of mountains of Serbia
List of rivers of Serbia
List of lakes of Serbia
List of waterfalls of Serbia
Immovable Cultural Heritage of Great Importance (Serbia)
List of natural monuments in Belgrade

Notes and references

Notes

References

External links
Ministry of Environmental Protection of Serbia
Institute for Nature Protection of Serbia
 Birdwatching in Serbia

 
 
Serbia
Protected areas
Protected natural resources